The Universalist Meeting House of Sheshequin is a historic church, built in 1827 in Bradford County, Pennsylvania.  The church is currently used during the months of July and August by the Unitarian Universalist Church of Athens and Sheshequin.

Surrounding the church is a contributing cemetery. The cemetery predates the meeting house by about 30 years, but was operated together with the church from 1827 to 1914.

It was added to the National Register of Historic Places in 2013.

References

Churches on the National Register of Historic Places in Pennsylvania
Churches completed in 1827
Churches in Bradford County, Pennsylvania
Methodist churches in Pennsylvania
National Register of Historic Places in Bradford County, Pennsylvania
1827 establishments in Pennsylvania